French the Kid is a British rapper and singer. Born in Harold Hill, his family moved to Australia and France while he was a child. He moved back to the UK in his teens, beginning to release freestyles on Instagram in 2018.

Early life
French the Kid was raised in Romford. In 2009 his family  moved to Australia before moving to France when he was nine. There, he would be exposed to numerous French hip-hop artists, including PNL and Jul.

After passing his exams, he moved back to England with his father.

Career
Beginning in 2018, French the Kid released freestyles through Instagram. He released his debut single, "Bella Latina", in 2019; the song switches between English and French.

In 2020, he released "Broken Lives & Stolen Peds", also appearing on the Mad About Bars and Daily Duppy freestyle series, with the latter having 17 million views as of April 2022. He would also collaborate with Kenny Allstar on "Coco".

In 2021, French the Kid released "Essex Boys" with Slimz and a remix of "Playing Games" with Jaykae. Later in the year, he released "Can't Feel My Face" and "Thrill", which peaked at number 98 and 90 on the UK Singles Chart, respectively.

In 2022, he released "Remedy", which peaked at number 81. In April, he released his debut mixtape, Never Been Ordinary. Featuring on the album of Jul named coeur blanc on the track premier league.

Discography

Mixtapes

Charted singles

References

Living people
UK drill musicians
Rappers from London
2000 births